Rank comparison chart of officer ranks for armies/land forces of African states.

Officers

Warrant officers

See also
Comparative army officer ranks of the Americas
Ranks and insignia of NATO armies officers

References

Military comparisons
Military in Africa